Viklund is a Swedish surname. Notable people with the surname include:

Andreas Viklund (born 1980), Swedish music producer, member of Lagoona
Therese Viklund (born 1987), Swedish equestrian
Tobias Viklund (born 1986), Swedish ice hockey player

Surnames of Swedish origin
Swedish-language surnames